The half dollar, sometimes referred to as the half for short or 50-cent piece, is a United States coin worth 50 cents, or one half of a dollar. The coin's design has undergone a number of changes throughout its history. Since 1964, the half dollar depicts the profile of President John F. Kennedy on the obverse and the Seal of the President of the United States on the reverse.

Though not commonly used today, half-dollar coins have a long history of heavy use alongside other denominations of coinage, but have faded out of general circulation for many reasons. They were produced in fairly large quantities until the year 2002, when the U.S. Mint ceased production of the coin for general circulation. As a result of its decreasing usage, many pre-2002 half dollars remain in Federal Reserve vaults, prompting the change in production. Presently, collector half dollars can be ordered directly from the U.S. Mint, and pre-2002 circulation half dollars may be ordered through most American banks and credit unions. In 2021, half dollars began to be produced for general circulation again.

Circulation
Half-dollar coins once saw heavy use, particularly in the first half of the 20th century. For many years, they were (and in many areas still are) commonly used by gamblers at casinos and other venues with slot machines. Rolls of half dollars may still be kept on hand in cardrooms for games requiring 50-cent antes or bring-in bets, for dealers to pay winning naturals in blackjack, or where the house collects a rake in increments. Additionally, some concession vendors at sporting events distribute half-dollar coins as change for convenience.

By the early 1960s, the rising price of silver neared the point where the bullion value of U.S. silver coins would exceed face value. In 1965, the U.S. introduced layered-composition coins made of a pure copper core sandwiched between two cupronickel outer faces. The silver content of dimes and quarters was eliminated, but the Kennedy half-dollar composition contained silver (reduced from 90% to 40%) from 1965 to 1970. Even with its reduced silver content, the half dollar attracted widespread interest from speculators and collectors, and that interest led to widespread hoarding of half dollars dated 1970 and earlier. In 1971, the half's composition was changed to match that of the clad dimes and quarters, and with an increase in production, the coin saw a moderate increase in usage; by this time however, many businesses and the public had begun to lose interest in the half dollar and by the end of the  1970s, the coin had gradually become uncommon in circulation. Merchants stopped ordering half dollars from their banks, and many banks stopped ordering half dollars from the Federal Reserve, and the U.S. mints sharply reduced production of the coins.

Since 2002, half dollars have been minted only for collectors, due to large Federal Reserve and government inventories on hand of pre-2001 pieces; this is mostly due to lack of demand and large quantity returns from casino slot machines that now operate "coin-less". Eventually, when the reserve supply runs low, the mint will again fill orders for circulation half dollars. It took about 18 years (1981–1999) for the large inventory stockpile of a similar low-demand circulation coin, the $1 coin, to reach reserve levels low enough to again produce circulation pieces. Modern-date half dollars can be purchased in proof sets, mint sets, rolls, and bags from the U.S. Mint, and existing inventory circulation pieces can be ordered through most U.S. banks and credit unions. All collector issues since 2001 have had much lower mintages than in previous years. Although intended only for collectors, these post-2001 half dollars  often find their way into circulation, with examples occurring in change or as payment for small transactions.

Aspects of early history
On December 1, 1794, the first half dollars, approximately 5,300 pieces, were delivered. Another 18,000 were produced in January 1795 using dies of 1794, to save the expense of making new ones. Another 30,000 pieces were struck by the end of 1801. The coin had the Heraldic Eagle, based on the Great Seal of the United States on the reverse. 150,000 were minted in 1804 but struck with dies from 1803, so no 1804 specimens exist, though there were some pieces dated 1805 that carried a "5 over 4" overdate.

In 1838, half-dollar dies were produced in the Philadelphia Mint for the newly established New Orleans Mint, and ten test samples of the 1838 half dollars were made at the main Philadelphia mint. These samples were put into the mint safe along with other rarities like the 1804 silver dollar. The dies were then shipped to New Orleans for the regular production of 1838 half dollars. However, New Orleans production of the half dollars was delayed due to the priority of producing half dimes and dimes. The large press for half-dollar production was not used in New Orleans until January 1839 to produce 1838 half dollars, but the reverse die could not be properly secured, and only ten samples were produced before the dies failed. Rufus Tyler, chief coiner of the New Orleans mint, wrote to Mint Director Patterson of the problem on February 25, 1839. The Orleans mint samples all had a double stamped reverse as a result of this production problem and they also showed dramatic signs of die rust, neither of which are present on the Philadelphia produced test samples. While eight Philadelphia minted samples survive to this day, there is only one known New Orleans minted specimen with the tell-tale double stamped reverse and die rust. This is the famous coin that Rufus Tyler presented to Alexander Dallas Bache (great grandson of Benjamin Franklin) in the summer of 1839 and was later purchased in June 1894 by A. G. Heaton, the father of mint mark coin collecting. The 1838 Philadelphia-produced half dollars are extremely rare, with two separate specimens having sold for $632,500 in Heritage auctions in 2005 and 2008 respectively.  The sole surviving Orleans minted 1838 is one of the rarest of all American coins. In 1840, this mint produced nearly 180,000 half dollars.

In 1861, the New Orleans mint produced coins for three different governments. A total of 330,000 were struck under the United States government, 1,240,000 for the State of Louisiana after it seceded from the Union, and 962,633 after it joined the Confederacy. Since the same die was used for all strikings, the output looks identical. However the Confederate States of America actually minted four half dollars with a CSA (rather than USA) reverse and the obverse die they used had a small die crack. Thus "regular" 1861 half dollars with this crack probably were used by the Confederates for some of the mass striking.

There are two varieties of Kennedy half dollars in the proof set issues of 1964. Initially, the die was used with accented hair, showing deeper lines than the president's widow, Jacqueline Kennedy, preferred. New dies were prepared to smooth out some of the details. It is estimated that about 1 to 3% (40,000 to 100,000) of the proof halves are of the earlier type, making them somewhat more expensive for collectors.

List of designs

 Silver half dollars
 Flowing Hair 1794–1795
 Draped Bust 1796–1807
 Draped Bust, Small Eagle 1796–1797
 Draped Bust, Heraldic Eagle 1801–1807
 Capped Bust 1807–1839
 Capped Bust (Large Size), With Motto 1807–1836
 Capped Bust (Small Size), No Motto 1836–1839
 Seated Liberty 1839–1891 
 Seated Liberty, No Motto 1839–1866
 Seated Liberty, With Motto 1866–1891
 Barber 1892–1915
 Walking Liberty 1916–1947
 Franklin 1948–1963
 Kennedy 1964 (General circulation issue) (the last 90% silver half dollar for circulation, contains 0.36169 oz. net silver per coin, or 7.234 oz. silver per roll)
 Kennedy 1992–present (silver proof sets available)

 40% silver half dollars
 Kennedy 1965–1970
 Kennedy 1976 (only collectors sets produced with 40% silver)

 Copper-nickel clad half dollars
 Kennedy 1971–1974, 1977–present
 Kennedy Bicentennial 1975–1976 (all dated 1776-1976)

List of early commemorative issues

Columbian half dollar (1892–1893)
Panama–Pacific half dollar (1915)
Illinois Centennial half dollar (1918)
Maine Centennial half dollar (1920)
Pilgrim Tercentenary half dollar (1920–1921)
Missouri Centennial half dollar (1921)
Alabama Centennial half dollar (1921)
Grant Memorial half dollar (1922)
Monroe Doctrine Centennial half dollar (1923)
Huguenot-Walloon half dollar (1924)
Lexington-Concord Sesquicentennial half dollar (1925)
Stone Mountain Memorial half dollar (1925)
California Diamond Jubilee half dollar (1925)
Fort Vancouver Centennial half dollar (1925)
United States Sesquicentennial half dollar (1926)
Oregon Trail Memorial half dollar (1926–1939)
Vermont Sesquicentennial half dollar (1927)
Hawaii Sesquicentennial half dollar (1928)
Maryland Tercentenary half dollar (1934)
Texas Centennial half dollar (1934–1938)
Daniel Boone Bicentennial half dollar (1934–1938)
Connecticut Tercentenary half dollar (1935)
Arkansas Centennial half dollar (1935–1939)
Arkansas-Robinson half dollar (1936)

Hudson Sesquicentennial half dollar (1935)
California Pacific International Exposition half dollar (1935–1936)
Old Spanish Trail half dollar (1935)
Rhode Island Tercentenary half dollar (1936)
Cleveland Centennial half dollar (1936)
Wisconsin Territorial Centennial half dollar (1936)
Cincinnati Musical Center half dollar (1936)
Long Island Tercentenary half dollar (1936)
York County, Maine Tercentenary half dollar (1936)
Bridgeport, Connecticut Centennial half dollar (1936)
Lynchburg Sesquicentennial half dollar (1936)
Elgin, Illinois, Centennial half dollar (1936)
Albany Charter half dollar (1936)
San Francisco–Oakland Bay Bridge half dollar (1936)
Columbia, South Carolina Sesquicentennial half dollar (1936)
Delaware Tercentenary half dollar (1936)
Battle of Gettysburg half dollar (1936)
Norfolk, Virginia, Bicentennial half dollar (1936)
Roanoke Island half dollar (1937)
Battle of Antietam half dollar (1937)
New Rochelle 250th Anniversary half dollar (1938)
Iowa Centennial half dollar (1946)
Booker T. Washington Memorial half dollar (1946–1954)

See also

 United States Mint coin production
 1814 platinum half dollar

References

Fifty-cent coins of the United States